The 2009 Korea Open Super Series was held from January 13, 2009 to January 18, 2009. It was a part of the 2009 BWF Super Series badminton tournament.

Men's singles

Results

Women's singles

Results

Men's doubles

Results

Women's doubles

Results

Mixed doubles

Results

References
http://www.tournamentsoftware.com/sport/tournament.aspx?id=BBB30509-C033-4691-B7A0-DD3282CF8B59

Korea Open (badminton)
Korea Open Super Series, 2009
Sport in Seoul
Korea Open